Rüdəkənar or Rudəkənar may refer to:
Rüdəkənar, Astara, Azerbaijan
Rüdəkənar, Masally, Azerbaijan